Aretha In Paris is a live album by American singer Aretha Franklin, released in 1968, by Atlantic Records. The album was recorded in Paris on May 7, 1968. It reached the Top 20 of Billboard's album chart. It was reissued on compact disc through Rhino Records in the 1990s.

Track listing
"(I Can't Get No) Satisfaction" (Mick Jagger, Keith Richards)
"Don't Let Me Lose This Dream" (Franklin, Teddy White)
"Soul Serenade" (Luther Dixon, Curtis Ousley)
"Night Life" (Willie Nelson, Walt Breeland, Paul Buskirk)
"Baby, I Love You" (Jimmy Holiday, Ronnie Shannon)
"Groovin'" (Eddie Brigati, Felix Cavaliere)
"(You Make Me Feel Like) A Natural Woman" (Carole King, Gerry Goffin, Jerry Wexler)
"Come Back Baby" (Ray Charles)
"Dr. Feelgood (Love Is a Serious Business)" (Franklin, Teddy White)
"(Sweet Sweet Baby) Since You've Been Gone" (Franklin, Teddy White)
"I Never Loved a Man (The Way I Love You)" (Ronnie Shannon)
"Chain of Fools" (Don Covay)
"Respect" (Otis Redding)

Personnel
 Aretha Franklin - vocals, piano
 Carolyn Franklin - background vocals
 Charnessa Jones - background vocals
 Wyline Ivey - background vocals
 Jerry Weaver - guitar
 Gary Illingworth - piano
 George Davidson - drums
 Ron Jackson - trumpet
 David Squire - baritone saxophone
 Donald "Buck" Waldon - tenor saxophone
 Charlie Gabriel - tenor saxophone
 Donald Townes - trumpet
 Little John Wilson - trumpet
 Miller Brisker - tenor saxophone
 Rene Pitts - trombone
 Rodderick Hicks - bass
 Russell Conway - trumpet

Charts

References

Albums produced by Jerry Wexler
Aretha Franklin live albums
1968 live albums
Atlantic Records live albums
Atco Records live albums